Biology for Christian Schools is a 1991 school-level biology textbook written from a Young Earth Creation point of view by William S. Pinkston and published by the Bob Jones University Press.  The book has been controversial because it espouses the idea of Biblical inerrancy; that whenever science and Christianity conflict, the current scientific understanding is wrong. The book promotes creationism, which is rejected by the National Academy of Sciences, the National Association of Biology Teachers and the National Science Teachers Association who state creationism and intelligent design are pseudoscience.

Francisco J. Ayala, a biologist at University of California, Irvine, wrote the book "rejects generally accepted scientific knowledge" and "explicitly rejects the scientific
methodology generally accepted by the scientific community."

2008 court decision
In 2005 the book became a subject in the lawsuit Association of Christian Schools International et al. v. Roman Stearns et al. The book states, "The people who have prepared this book have tried consistently to put the Word of God first and science second." ACSI sued the University of California for discrimination against its science courses that contain creationist ideas. In the March 2008 ruling the Judge quoted Biology for Christian Schools stating:

References

External links

More Bob Jones “Biology for Christian Schools” Howlers, The Panda's Thumb (blog)
Documents
Rejection of Summary Judgement for the Plaintiffs and Partial Summary Judgement for the Defendants

1991 non-fiction books
English-language books
Intelligent design books